Formica uralensis is a species of ant in the genus Formica. It is found in Belarus, Denmark, Estonia, Finland, France, Germany, Kazakhstan, Latvia, Lithuania, Norway, Poland, Russia, Sweden, Switzerland, and Ukraine.

References

uralensis
Hymenoptera of Europe
Insects described in 1895
Taxonomy articles created by Polbot